

Principalities

Princes and dukes of Guria
Kakhaber I Gurieli c. 1385–1410
Mamia Gurieli c. 1450–1469
Kakhaber II Gurieli 1469–1483
Giorgi I Gurieli 1483–1512
Mamia I Gurieli 1512–1534
Rostom Gurieli 1534–1564
Giorgi II Gurieli 1564–1583
Vakhtang I Gurieli 1583–1587
Giorgi II Gurieli 1587–1600
Mamia II Gurieli 1600–1625
Simon I Gurieli 1625
Kaikhosro I Gurieli 1625–1658
Demetre Gurieli 1659–1668
Giorgi III Gurieli 1669–1684
Kaikhosro II Gurieli 1685–1689
Mamia III Gurieli 1689–1712
Giorgi IV Gurieli 1712
Kaikhosro III Gurieli 1716
Mamia IV Gurieli 1726–1756
Giorgi V Gurieli 1756–1758 
Simon II Gurieli 1788–1792
Vakhtang II Gurieli 1792–1797
Mamia V Gurieli 1797–1826
Kaikhosro IV Gurieli, 1797–1809
David Gurieli 1826–1829

Princes of Svaneti
 Konstantine Dadeshkeliani (born 1826– died 1857)
 Tsiokh Dadeshkeliani
 Tengis Dadeshkeliani
 Isam Dadeshkeliani

Princes of Meskheti
 Botso Jaqeli c. 1184–1191
 Ivane I Jaqeli c. 1191–1247
 Sargis I Jaqeli 1268–1279
 Beka I Jaqeli 1285–1306
 Sargis II Jaqeli 1306–1334
 Qvarqvare I Jaqeli 1334–1361
 Beka II Jaqeli 1361–1391
 Shalva Jaqeli 1372–1389
 Aghbugha I Jaqeli 1389–1395
 Ivane II Jaqeli 1391–1444
 Aghbugha II Jaqeli 1444–1451
 Qvarqvare II Jaqeli 1451–1498
 Kaikhosro I Jaqeli 1498–1500
 Mzetchabuk Jaqeli 1500–1515
 Manuchar I Jaqeli 1515–1518
 Qvarqvare III Jaqeli 1518–1535
 Kaikhosro II Jaqeli 1545–1573
 Qvarqvare IV Jaqeli 1573–1581
 Manuchar II Jaqeli 1581–1607
 Manuchar III Jaqeli 1607–1628
 Beka III Jaqeli 1625–1635
 Yusuf I Jaqeli 1635–1647
 Rostom Jaqeli 1647–1658
 Aslan I Jaqeli 1658–1679
 Yusuf II Jaqeli 1679–1688
 Salim Jaqeli 1688–1701
 Isaq I Jaqeli 1701–1705, 1708–1716, 1718–1737 and 1744–1745

Princes of Abkhazia
Putu Sharvashidze (circa 1580–1620)
Seteman Sharvashidze (circa 1620–1640)
Sustar Sharvashidze (circa 1640–1665)
Zegnak Sharvashidze (circa 1665–1700)
Rostom Shervashidze (circa 1700–1730)
Manuchar Sharvashidze (circa 1730–1750)
Zurab Sharvashidze (circa 1750–1780)
Kelesh Ahmed-Bey Sharvashidze (circa 1780–1808)
Aslan-Bey Sharvashidze (1808–1810)
Sefer Ali-Bey (George) (1810–1821)
Umar-Bey (Demetreus) (1821–1822)
Mikhail Sharvashidze (1822–1864)
 Abkhazia incorporated into the Russian Empire (1864)
Giorgi Sharvashidze (George) (1866–1918)
Aleksandr Sharvashidze (Alexander) (1918–1968)

Aslan-Bey Branch

George Konstantinovich Sharvashidze (1973–2010)
Teimuraz Georgievitch Sharvashidze (2010-)
Nikoloz/Nicolas Sharvashidze

Sefer-Ali Bey Branch
George Shervashidze (1968–1978)
Nikita Shervashidze (1978–2008)
Andrew Shervashidze (2008-)

Princes, dukes and grand dukes of Samegrelo
 Vardan I Dadiani (ca 1180s – 1190s)
 Shergil Dadiani (ca 1220s – 1240s)
 Vardan II Dadiani (ca 1240s – 1250s)
 Tsotne Dadiani (ca 1260s)
 Bedan Dadiani (ca 1270s – ca 1290s)
 Giorgi I Dadiani (ca 1293–1323)
 Goshadze Dynasty (XIII–XIX)
 Mamia I Dadiani (1323–1345)
 Giorgi II Dadiani (1345–1384)
 Vameq I Dadiani (1384–1396)
 Mamia II Dadiani (1396–1414)
 Liparit I Dadiani (1414–1470)
 Shamandavle Dadiani (1470–1473)
 Vameq II Dadiani (1474–1482)
 Liparit II Dadiani (1482–1512)
 Mamia III Dadiani (1512–1533)
 Levan I Dadiani (1533–1546)
 Giorgi III Dadiani (1546–1573, 1574–1582)
 Mamia IV Dadiani (1574, 1582–1590)
 Manuchar I Dadiani (1590–1611)
 Levan II Dadiani (1611–1657)
 Liparit III Dadiani (1657–1658)
 Vameq III Dadiani (1658–1661)
 Levan III Dadiani (1661–1681)
 Levan IV Dadiani (1681–1691)
 Giorgi IV Dadiani (Lipartiani) (1700–1704, 1710–1714)
 Katsia I Dadiani (1704–1710)
 Bezhan I Dadiani (1714–1728)
 Otia I Dadiani (1728–1758)
 Katsia II Dadiani (1758–1788)
 Grigol I Dadiani (1788–1791, 1794–1802, 1802–1804)
 Manuchar II Dadiani (1791–1793)
 Tariel Dadiani (1793–1794, 1802)
 Levan V Dadiani (1804–1840)
 David I Dadiani (1840–1853)
 Niko I Dadiani (1853–1857)
 Niko I Dadiani (1857–1903)
 Niko II Dadiani (1903–1919)
 Shalva Dadiani (1919–1959)
 Archil Dadiani (1959–1976)

Georgia princes
Princes
Princes
Princes